is the third major label album release of the Japanese rock band, The Back Horn. The album was released on October 22, 2003.

Track listing

Wakusei Melancholy (惑星メランコリー) – 4:42
Hikari no Kesshō (光の結晶) – 5:21
Sixth major single.
Kodoku na Senjō (孤独な戦場) – 4:36
Koufuku na Nakigara (幸福な亡骸) – 4:30
Hanabira (花びら) – 4:28
Platonic Fuzz (プラトニックファズ) – 4:50
Seimeisen (生命線) – 4:31
Seventh major single.
Hane ~Yozora o Koete~ (羽根～夜空を越えて～) – 5:47
Akame no Rojō (赤眼の路上) – 4:51
Joker (ジョーカー) – 5:06
Mirai (未来) – 5:16
Fifth major single and theme song to the movie Akarui Mirai.

The Back Horn albums
2003 albums
Victor Entertainment albums